"Patience" is the third episode of the eighth season of the American science fiction television series The X-Files. The episode was written and directed by series creator Chris Carter. "Patience" is a "Monster-of-the-Week" story, unconnected to the series' wider mythology. The episode received a Nielsen rating of 8.2 and was viewed by 13.3 million viewers. The episode received mixed to negative reviews from critics.

The series centers on FBI special agents Dana Scully (Gillian Anderson) and her new partner John Doggett (Robert Patrick)—following the alien abduction of her former partner, Fox Mulder (David Duchovny)—who work on cases linked to the paranormal, called X-Files. In this episode, John Doggett, after having been assigned to the X-Files, joins Scully to investigate a series of gruesome murders that appear to be the work of a bat-like creature. This being their first case together, Scully and Doggett find that their investigative techniques are less than similar.

Carter was inspired to write "Patience" to emulate the  "back-to-basics stand alones […] of the earlier seasons". The episode was the first The X-Files entry to neither feature actor David Duchovny nor feature his name in the opening credits. Furthermore, the episode was crafted to be the first to test Doggett's skepticism of paranormal activity.

Plot
In Burley, Idaho, an undertaker and his wife are brutally murdered by some sort of flying creature. Later, Dana Scully (Gillian Anderson) and John Doggett (Robert Patrick), who has been assigned to the X-Files, begin talking about the case. Scully explains about the death of the undertaker and his wife and notes that the cause of death is blood loss from human bite marks on their bodies.

Scully and Doggett arrive at the crime scene in Idaho and meet Detective Yale Abbott. He says they are less sure that the bites were made by a human and draws their attention to the strange footprint, believing that wild animals fed on the bodies after the fact. Scully points out that there is only one footprint, which looks ominously human, and that if it were left by an animal there would be more footprints leading to the bodies. Scully and Doggett check out the house and find prints leading upstairs and into the attic. Inside, Scully and Doggett find the missing fingers of the undertaker. They look like they have been regurgitated by something and the claw marks in the attic suggest something was hanging from the rafters. Meanwhile, elderly Mrs. McKesson is killed in her attic while looking at a photo album.

At the morgue, Scully explains that she studied the bite wounds and discovered that they are similar, but intrinsically different, than human bites; the saliva on the regurgitated fingers has anti-coagulants in it, which only bats have in their saliva. Doggett finds the evidence interesting, due to the newspaper article he brought Scully: in 1956, a series of deaths was reported that ended when a group of hunters killed a man-bat creature and brought it to the county morgue in part of Montana. The coroner said the creature was neither bat nor man. Then the coroner was killed a few days later and soon after a few more people were killed or disappeared.

Scully and Doggett join the investigation at McKesson's home. Scully suggests a connection between the burned body of Ariel McKesson who disappeared in 1956 and her mother, the latest victim. Scully believes that the burned body should be exhumed to potentially learn the connection with the other deaths. Later, the gravediggers already have the coffin excavated when Detective Abbott shows up at the town cemetery. They tell him that they did not have to dig because somebody already dug the coffin up and scratched the lid up. While they drive off with the body, Abbott inspects a dead tree. The creature is within and it eviscerates Abbott.

The police are upset about Abbott's death and blame Scully while Doggett reminds them that only the thing that killed Abbott and the others is to blame. Scully explains Ariel McKesson died of heart failure and then was burned to cover something up. She realizes that all the victims were people who came in contact with the body of Ariel McKesson: Abbott investigated the crime, her mother identified the body, the undertaker prepared the body, and Myron Stefaniuk pulled the body from the river. All but Myron Stefaniuk are now dead. Doggett and Scully find Myron and ask him about Ernie Stefaniuk, one of the hunters from 1956, who he reveals disappeared a long time ago. The two eventually track down Ernie Stefaniuk, who tells them that he hid on an island in the middle of the town's lake with his wife, Ariel, for 44 years. Ernie says that the bat creature kills anyone with Ernie's scent on them, so he had burned his wife's body to try and cover up the scent. He informs them that it hunts only at night and Myron is in danger. Doggett goes back to find Myron only to be attacked and badly torn up by the creature at the river.

Ernie says Scully is now marked and the creature will go after her too. When his ground radar goes off, Scully goes outside. Ernie stays inside and is butchered by the bat creature. Scully returns to see it ravaging Ernie; she manages to shoot it before being knocked down. Doggett appears and shoots the creature several more times, saving Scully. The creature disappears into the night while Scully helps the injured Doggett. Back at the office, they get a fax from Myron, who survived and has gone into hiding in Wyoming.

Production

"Patience" was written and directed by series creator Chris Carter. The episode, inspired by the "back-to-basics stand alones […] of the earlier seasons", features a human-bat hybrid as the main villain; this character was inspired by the 1970s comic book villain, Man-Bat, one of the arch-nemeses of Batman. During the filming of the episode, live bats, such as the Egyptian fruit bat were used.

"Patience" was the first to test Doggett's skepticism of paranormal activity. As Robert Patrick explained, "['Patience'] is where it starts to toy with my willingness to believe in the paranormal and strange happenings. You've got a guy that's a bat, which is sort of out of the norm." The episode was also the first episode of The X-Files to neither feature actor David Duchovny nor feature his name in the opening credits. After settling his contract dispute with Fox, Duchovny quit full-time participation in the show after the seventh season. (In order to explain Mulder's absence, Duchovny's character was abducted by aliens in the seventh season finale, "Requiem".)

Reception

Ratings
"Patience" first aired on Fox on November 19, 2000. The episode earned a Nielsen household rating of 8.2, meaning that it was seen by 8.2% of the nation's estimated households. The episode was viewed by 8.27 million households, and 13.3 million viewers. The episode ranked as the 42nd most-watched episode for the week ending November 19. The episode subsequently aired in the United Kingdom on the BBC Two on July 28, 2002. Fox promoted the episode with the tagline "More deadly than a man. More ruthless than a bat. A hungry predator waits in the darkness for its next prey... Scully and Doggett."

Reviews
Jay Anderson, writing for What Culture, was positive toward the episode. While noting the show's return to its "dark, creepy [...] roots" in the eighth season, Anderson described the episode as an "early success at returning to the realm of the scary". Anderson ranked the human bat as the eighth creepiest creature of the show. Television Without Pity writer Jessica Morgan rated the episode a D and criticized the episode's references to Mulder's absence, most notably the scene wherein Scully put Mulder's nameplate away, asking, sardonically, "Is that supposed to be symbolic, I wonder?" Robert Shearman and Lars Pearson, in their book Wanting to Believe: A Critical Guide to The X-Files, Millennium & The Lone Gunmen, rated the episode two-and-a-half stars out of five. The two noted that, despite the fact that "a lot of [the episode] works […] because the scenes between Doggett and Scully are so good", the positive aspects of the episode were not "put to better use in a more exciting episode; this particular case hardly stretched anyone's deductive prowess." Shearman and Pearson later wrote that if the episode had been "a Mulder and Scully adventure, this would have been bottom of the barrel stuff."

Emily VanDerWerff of The A.V. Club awarded the episode a "C+" and criticized both its monster and its guest cast. Concerning the former, she wrote that it was "just ridiculous" and that its design was "bland and generic". Concerning the latter, she wrote that the cast was filled with "actors hamming it up". VanDerWerff did note that the episode was better "than its reputation" suggested, but that it still was "undone by some very strange story choices and a dumb monster". Paula Vitaris from Cinefantastique gave the episode a negative review and awarded it one-and-a-half stars out of four. Vitaris bluntly wrote, "if you're looking for a suspenseful, bite-your-nails, monster-of-the-week X-Files episode… this isn't it." Furthermore, she criticized the villain, calling it "a dull monster in fake-looking make-up".

Awards
"Patience" earned a nomination for an ASC Award by the American Society of Cinematographers for Outstanding Achievement in Cinematography - Regular Series.

See also
 Flying primates theory

Notes

Footnotes

Bibliography

External links 

 

2000 American television episodes
Television episodes directed by Chris Carter
Television episodes written by Chris Carter
The X-Files (season 8) episodes
Bats in popular culture
Television episodes about mammals
Television episodes set in Idaho